Voldemar Lestienne (2 December 1931 – 1 December 1990 in Paris) was a French writer and journalist, winner of the 1975 prix Interallié.

Biography 
Voldemar Lestienne is a journalist and a reporter before becoming deputy editor-in-chief of the newspaper France-Soir and then deputy director of France Dimanche. At the same time, he wrote a career as a writer with two successful sales novels, Furioso and Fracasso - transpositions of Dumas's Three Musketeers in the context of the Second World War, and was rewarded by the Prix Interallié for L'Amant de poche (1975) and which was his latest novel though.

Work 
1958: Dillinger
1958: Furioso
1973: Fracasso, Livre de Poche,  
1975: L'Amant de poche — Éditions Grasset, Prix Interallié

References

External links 
 Voldemar Lestienne on Babelio
 Les furieux fracas de Voldemar Lestienne on Unidivers
 Voldemar Lestienne on  Goodreads

20th-century French writers
21st-century French journalists
Prix Interallié winners
1931 births
1990 deaths